Villers-le-Sec may refer to the following communes in France:

 Villers-le-Sec, Aisne, in the Aisne département 
 Villers-le-Sec, Marne, in the Marne département 
 Villers-le-Sec, Meuse, in the Meuse département 
 Villers-le-Sec, Haute-Saône, in the Haute-Saône département

See also

Villiers-le-Sec (disambiguation)